Junín is a Department of San Luis Province, Argentina.

With an area of  it borders to the west with the Department of Ayacucho, to the south with San Martín and Chacabuco, to the north with the provinces of Córdoba.

Municipalities
 Carpintería
 Cerro de Oro
 Lafinur
 Los Cajones
 Los Molles
 Merlo
 Santa Rosa de Conlara
 Talita

Villages
 Bañado de Cautana
 Balde de Escudero
 Capilla de Romero
 Cerrito Blanco
 Injertos
 La Aguada
 La Invernada
 La Médula
 La Quebrada
 La Unión
 Las Chilcas
 Las Islitas
 Las Lomitas
 Las Palomas
 Los Argüellos
 Los Chañares
 Los Duraznitos
 Los Quebrachos
 Ojo del Río
 Paso Ancho
 Piedra Blanca
 Punta del Agua
 Rincón del Este
 Rosario

References

Departments of San Luis Province